Zinc finger protein 10 is a protein that in humans is encoded by the ZNF10 gene.

Function 

The protein encoded by this gene contains a C2H2 zinc finger, and has been shown to function as a transcriptional repressor. The Kruppel-associated box (KRAB) domain of this protein is found to be responsible for its transcriptional repression activity. RING finger containing protein TIF1 was reported to interact with the KRAB domain, and may serve as a mediator for the repression activity of this protein.

Interactions 

ZNF10 has been shown to interact with TRIM28.

References

Further reading

External links 
 

Transcription factors